(15 January 1943 – 15 September 2018) was a Japanese actress for Japanese cinema and television.

Biography
Kiki was born on January 15, 1943, in Kanda, Tokyo. Her father was a master of the biwa lute and a former police officer. Her mother owned a cafe in Jinbōchō, Tokyo and a restaurant in Noge, Yokohama, the latter being Kiki's maternal parents' home. Her mother was seven years senior to her father and had a child from both her two previous marriages.

After graduating from high school, she started her acting career in the early 1960s as a member of the Bungakuza theater troupe using the stage name Chiho Yūki (悠木千帆). She eventually gained fame for performing uniquely comedic and eccentric roles on such television shows as Jikan desu yo and Terauchi Kantarō ikka and in television commercials. She changed her name to "Kirin Kiki" when, after being asked on a television show to auction off something of hers, she ended up selling her first stage name, claiming she had "nothing else to sell." 

While battling various ailments, including a detached retina in 2003 and breast cancer in 2005, Kiki continued to act and won several awards, including the best actress Japan Academy Prize for  Mom and Me, and Sometimes Dad in 2008, the best supporting actress award from the Yokohama Film Festival for her work in Kamikaze Girls and Half a Confession in 2004, and the best supporting actress Blue Ribbon Award for Still Walking in 2008.

Personal life
Kiki married fellow Bungakuza actor Shin Kishida. They separated in 1968. She married musician Yuya Uchida in 1973, and remained legally married to him though they separated in 1975. Their daughter, Yayako Uchida, is an essayist and musician, and portrayed the younger self of Kiki's character in the film Tokyo Tower: Mom and Me, and Sometimes Dad. Yayako Uchida is married to the actor Masahiro Motoki, who was adopted into the Uchida family as a mukoyōshi. Kirin's granddaughter Kyara Uchida has appeared with her in two films, I Wish and Sweet Bean.

Kiki was diagnosed with cancer in 2004 and underwent a mastectomy. She died of cancer, and related illnesses, on 15 September 2018.

Selected filmography

Film

 Zoku Yoidore hakase (1966) - Fumiko
 Lake of Tears (1966) - Kayo Sugumo
 Tonogata goyôjin (1966)
 Tabiji (1967) - Chie
 Aniki no koibito (1968) - Sanae
 Kamisama no koibito (1968) - Aiko Yamagami
 Dai bakuhatsu (1969)
 Tora-san, His Tender Love (1970) - Maid in Shinshû
 Aka chôchin (1974)
 Akumyo: shima arashi (1974) - Oshige
 Jack and the Beanstalk (1974) - Madam Noir (voice)
 Honô no shôzô (1974)
 Abayo dachikô (1974)
 Mamushi to aodaishô (1975) - Kiku Matsukawa
 Za.Dorifutazu no kamo da!! Goyo da!! (1975) - tomiko
 Eden no umi (1976) - Orittsan
 Sachiko no sachi (1976) - Momoe
 Onna kyôshi (1977) - Yuriko Yokoyama
 Ballad of Orin (1977) - Tama Ichise
 Wani to oum to ottosei (1977) - Mary
 Taro the Dragon Boy (1979) - Yamanba (voice)
 Sochô no kubi (1979) - Okonomiyaki Manager
 Kindaichi Kosuke no boken (1979) - Tane
 Kamisamaga kureta akanbô (1979) - Woman who brought a boy
 Zigeunerweisen (1980) - Kimi
 Otake shinobu no a! Kono ai nakuba ganbasseyo Kuni-chan (1980)
 Tosa No Ipponzuri (1980) - Fuki
 Nogiku no haka (1981) - Omasu
 Tenkōsei (1982) - Naoko Saitoh
 Keiji monogatari (1982) - Sumi Yashiro
 Santô kôkôsei (1982)
 Amagi goe (1983) - Ryosaku's Wife
 Hometown (1983) - Yoshi
 Capone Cries a Lot (1985) - Sene Tachikawa
 Lonely Heart (1985) - Terue Amano
 Yumechiyo nikki (1985) - Kikuyakko
 Kyôshû (1988) - Mine Kamioka
 Tsuru (1988) - Yura
 Daidokoro No Seijo (1988) - Hisajo Sugita
 Kaze no Matasaburô - Garasu no manto (1989) - Otane
 Donmai (1990) - Hanako
 Rainbow Kids (1991) - Kura Nakamura
 Sensou to seishun (1991) - Etsuko Onoki
 Za Chugaku kyoshi (1992)
 The Triple Cross (1992)
 Yearning (1993) - Omatsu
 Rampo (1994) - House wife / Head of maid
 Toki no kagayaki (1995) - Nagashima
 Rintaro (輝け！隣太郎, Kagayake! Rintaro) (1995, she also sang the title song (with Toshiaki Karasawa))
 Oishinbo (1996)
 Koi to hanabi to kanransha (1997) - Sanae Mita
 Hissatsu shimatsunin (1997) - Otora
 Ashita heno kakehashi (1997)
 39 keihô dai sanjûkyû jô (1997) - Defence Counsel Shigure Nagamura
 Zawa-zawa Shimo-Kitazawa (2000) - Fan of Kyushiro
 Drug (2001) - Yoshie Hirakawa
 Tôkyô Marîgôrudo (2001) - Ritsuko Sakai
 Pistol Opera (2001) - Rin
 Danbôru hausu gâru (2001)
 Inochi (2002) - Mother
 Returner (2002) - Xie
 Yoru o kakete (2002)
 Hotaru no hoshi (2003) - Headmistress
 Half a Confession (2004) - Yasuko Shimamura
 Kamikaze Girls (2004) - Momoko's Grandmother
 Izo (2004)
 Chekeraccho!! (2006) - Chisa Haebaru
 Brave Story (2006) - Onba (voice)
 Akai kujira to shiroi hebi (2006) - Midori Ohara
 Tôkyô tawâ: Okan to boku to, tokidoki, oton (2007) - Eiko Nakagawa
 Saido kâ ni inu (2007) - Granny Tome
 Still Walking (2008) - Toshiko Yokoyama
 Tokyo Tower: Mom and Me, and Sometimes Dad (2008)
 Miyagino (2008) - Madam
 The Borrower Arrietty (2010) - Haru (voice)
 Villain (2010) - Fusae Shimizu
 Ghost: In Your Arms Again (2010)
 Ôki-ke no tanoshii ryokô: Shinkon jigoku-hen (2011)
 Hanezu (2011) - Takumi's Mother
 I Wish (2011) - Hideko (Grandmother)
 Chronicle of My Mother (2011) - Yae
 Tsunagu (2012) - Aiko
 Yakusoku: Nabari dokubudôshu jiken shikeishû no shôgai (2013) - Iatsuno okunishi
 Like Father, Like Son (2013) - Riko Ishizeki
 Sweet Bean (2015; Best Performance by an Actress, Asia Pacific Screen Awards 2015) - Tokue
 Our Little Sister (2015) - Fumiyo Kikuchi
 Kakekomi onna to kakedashi otoko (2015) - Genbee
 After the Storm (2016) – Yoshiko
 Mori, The Artist's Habitat (2018) - Hideko Kumagai
 Shoplifters (2018) - Hatsue Shibata
 Every Day A Good Day (2018) - Ms. Takeda
 Cherry Blossoms and Demons (2019) - Großmutter von Yu
 Erica 38 (2019) - Erica's mother (final film role)

Television
 Shadow Warriors (1980-1986) - Orin
 Hanekonma (1986) - Yae (Hanekonma's mother)
 Tobu ga Gotoku (1990) - Ikushima
 Kimi no Na wa (1991)
 Aoi (2000) - Lady Kasuga

Honours
Medal with Purple Ribbon (2008)
Order of the Rising Sun, 4th Class, Gold Rays with Rosette (2014)

References

External links

 
 

1943 births
2018 deaths
20th-century Japanese actresses
21st-century Japanese actresses
Actresses from Tokyo
Recipients of the Medal with Purple Ribbon
Recipients of the Order of the Rising Sun, 4th class
Deaths from cancer in Japan
deaths from breast cancer
Asia Pacific Screen Award winners